Tongam Rina (born 1979) is an Indian journalist and human rights activist. She is currently (2020) the Deputy Editor of The Arunachal Times and former president of the Arunachal Pradesh Union of Working Journalists. She has been repeatedly threatened, and in 2012, was near-fatally shot outside her office after she wrote critical articles about corruption, militants and dam projects in Arunachal Pradesh.

Career 
Rina started as a journalist in 2003. She has been writing about the insurgent group National Socialist Council of Nagaland (IM), corruption, hydropower projects, and the injustices that the tribals face. Some of the topics covered include corruption in kerosene and food distribution. She also led the Siang People's Forum as its vice-president, campaigning against the plans to construct dams across the Siang River.

Assassination attempt 
Rina was shot at by three gunmen on the evening of 15 July 2012, outside the Itanagar office of The Arunachal Times. She was immediately taken to the nearby Rama Krishna Mission Hospital, where the doctors' prognosis revealed that she had sustained serious injuries to her intestines and spinal cord, and she was rushed into surgery. After repeated demands from the press, the state's police department handed over the case to the Central Bureau of Investigation, which turned it down. More than a year later, the police identified one Yumlang Achung as having planned the attack. His accomplices, Ajit Pegu and Raju Gurung revealed that they were upset at Rina for not reporting about Achung or his group's activities in her newspaper. Achung was later arrested and released, and Rina recovered from her injuries, as the bullet had simply grazed her spinal cord.

Awards and accolades 
For her journalistic work covering the unsuitability of hydropower projects, she received "Wind under the Wings Award" presented in 2017 by The Sanctuary Nature Foundation. She has also been awarded the CNN-IBN Indian of the Year in Public Service, for the year 2015, the Laadli Media Award 2011–12 for Gender Sensitivity, and was honoured by the Reporters Without Borders in 2014. In 2013, she was chosen for the 'Prize for the Freedom and Future of the Media', awarded by the Media Foundation of Leipzig, Germany.

References

Indian human rights activists
Living people
Indian women journalists
Journalists from Arunachal Pradesh
Women human rights activists
Women writers from Arunachal Pradesh
21st-century Indian women writers
21st-century Indian journalists
1979 births